Evie May is an Australian musical by Hugo Chiarella (book and lyrics) and Naomi Livingston (music and lyrics).  Set in 1966 on the evening of the last Tivoli performance in Sydney, the show follows veteran variety star Evie May as she recalls the events that lead her from obscurity in regional Western Australia to the Australian variety circuit - and the many sacrifices made to get there.

Productions
Chiarella and Livingston began collaborating on the show while they were touring in the Australian cast of Les Miserables. In 2016, the show was picked up for development by New Musicals Australia and secured a season at the Hayes Theatre in Sydney in 2018 with the support of the Australia Council for the Arts.

The original Australian production of Evie May opened at the Hayes Theatre on the 12th of October 2018. The show was directed by Kate Champion, with musical direction and orchestration by Steven Kreamer, musical supervision by Max Lambert, design by Anna Gardiner, lighting design by Sian James-Holland and sound design by Nate Edmondson.

Original cast
 Amanda Harrison as Evie May
 Loren Hunter as Evelyn
 Bishanyia Vincent as June
 Keegan Joyce as Cole
 Tim Draxl as Heaney
 Jo Turner as Barlow

Musical numbers

Act I
At The Tivoli – Full Company
Here I Am – Evie
Ain’t No Dope – Bob, Barlow
The Only You I’ve Ever Known – Evelyn, Barlow
The View – Evelyn
How The World Happened – Heaney
The View (reprise) – Evelyn, Heaney 
The Life Of A Woman – June
My Story - Evelyn, Evie
Oh Baby Be Nice – June, Evelyn, Evie
Bindy Do The Lindy – Evelyn
The Curtain – June, Evelyn
Belong – Evelyn
Who Is That Girl – June, Evelyn, Evie
They Say I Am Too Young – June, Evelyn, Evie
Belong (reprise) – Evelyn

Act II
Forgetful Sod – Evie
Great Australian Digger – Evelyn
Curtain (reprise) – Evie
This Child – Evie, Evelyn
How The World Happened (reprise) – Evie, Evelyn, Heaney
And It Turns – Evie, Evelyn
One Last Chance – Cole
Show Me Where To Stand – Evie, Evelyn

Reception
In her review for Stage Noise, critic, Diana Simmonds wrote of the show, "Evie May is rude, funny, sad and humane in its portrayal of lives and times now gone; yet when it comes to women’s place in the world, there’s much that’s familiar. And in a musical setting, with sharp, smart lyrics, the poignancy and politics are heightened and vividly coloured. This is a remarkable addition to Australian musical theatre". Judith Greenaway wrote for ArtsHub, "Evie May ends in a bareness of space, an echo chamber of those limited choices that empowered a modern movement. This is an entertaining, crafted, timely and relevant work." In his review for Stage Whispers, Peter Gotting wrote, "When the lights go up on this new Australian musical, there’s a sense of maturity - Sydney’s Hayes Theatre is now producing premieres of variety and accomplishment rarely seen in this country before."

Recording
In 2019 a live cast recording of the show was released featuring the original cast. The recording was made with the support of The Russell Mills Foundation and The Ron and Margaret Dobell Foundation.

Track listing

Awards and nominations

References

External links
 https://hayestheatre.com.au/event/evie-may-a-tivoli-story/

2018 musicals
Australian musicals